South of Monterey is a 1946 American Western film directed by William Nigh and written by Charles S. Belden. The film stars Gilbert Roland, Martin Garralaga, Frank Yaconelli, Marjorie Riordan, Iris Flores and George J. Lewis. The film was released on June 15, 1946, by Monogram Pictures.

Plot

Cast           
Gilbert Roland as The Cisco Kid
Martin Garralaga as Auturo Morales
Frank Yaconelli as Baby
Marjorie Riordan as Maria Morales
Iris Flores as Carmelita
George J. Lewis as Carlos Mandreno
Harry Woods as Bennet
Terry Frost as Morgan 
Rosa Turich as Lola

References

External links
 

1946 films
1940s English-language films
American Western (genre) films
1946 Western (genre) films
Monogram Pictures films
Films directed by William Nigh
American black-and-white films
1940s American films